Paul Tindill (born 6 November 1939) is New Zealand former cricketer who played one first-class match for Wellington. He was the son of Eric Tindill.

References

External links 
 Cricinfo
 CricketArchive

1939 births
Living people
New Zealand cricketers
Wellington cricketers
Wicket-keepers